The Cayman Islands competed at the 2011 World Championships in Athletics from August 27 to September 4 in Daegu, South Korea.
One athlete, 110m hurdler Ronald Forbes, represented the country
in the event.

Results

Men

References

External links
Official local organising committee website
Official IAAF competition website

Nations at the 2011 World Championships in Athletics
World Championships in Athletics
Cayman Islands at the World Championships in Athletics